Jessica María Duarte Volweider (born February 19, 1992) is a Venezuelan model and beauty pageant titleholder. She represented Trujillo at Miss Venezuela 2015 and was crowned Miss Venezuela International by the outgoing title holder Edymar Martínez. Jessica represented Venezuela at Miss International 2016 pageant.

Biography
Jessica Duarte is a model born in Caracas whose parents are Nelson Duarte Darauche, Venezuelan economist of Portuguese-Arab descent and Jessica Volweider, Venezuelan lawyer of German descent. Jessica graduated dentist at the Santa Maria University.

Similarly, Jessica was the winner of Elite Model Look Venezuela 2008 and represented Venezuela in Cyzone Look 2012 contest where she was positioned as a finalist.

Miss Venezuela 2015 

During the Interactive Gala of Miss Venezuela 2015, before the final night of competition event, Jessica won the special bands "Miss Face" and "Miss Online". The final of the Miss Venezuela 2015 took place the night on October 8 where Jessica won the title of Miss Venezuela International 2015 at the hands of his predecessor Edymar Martínez who a few weeks later was crowned Miss International 2015.

Miss International 2016
Jessica represented Venezuela at Miss International 2016 pageant in Tokyo, Japan but Unplaced.

References 

Living people
Miss Venezuela
Venezuelan beauty pageant winners
1992 births
Miss International 2016 delegates
People from Caracas
Venezuelan people of Portuguese descent
Venezuelan people of Arab descent
Venezuelan people of German descent